Elizabeth Bradford Holbrook, CM, O.Ont (7 November 1913 – 23 February 2009) was a Canadian portrait sculptor, medal designer and liturgical artist.

Education and training
Born in Hamilton, Ontario, on November 7, 1913, Elizabeth Bradford Holbrook was the great-great-granddaughter of  the Hon. John Willson, the first speaker for the House in Upper Canada. Holbrook studied at the Hamilton Art School (1928–31), Ontario College of Art (1932-35), Royal College of Art in London, England (1936) and at Cranbrook Academy of Art in Bloomfield Hills, Michigan (1948). She studied with such artists as Hortense Gordon, John S. Gordon, John Sloan, Gustav Hahn, Emanuel Hahn, Rowley Murphy, and Carl Milles.

She was a lecturer in Sculpture at the Dundas Valley School of Art from 1965 to 1969., at the Burlington Cultural Centre from 1990-1993 and at McMaster University, Faculty of Arts in Hamilton, Ontario from 1995-1999. Holbrook’s portrait sculptures are represented in over 50 public collections worldwide.

Subjects
Holbrook's subjects included HM Queen Elizabeth II; William Osler; Ellen Fairclough; John Diefenbaker; Emanuel Hahn; Henry Moore;  among many others. Her works include the bronze 24' standing figure of a Royal Military College of Canada cadet 1979 (later known as ‘Brucie’), which was a gift of the Royal Military College Club. She also produced a bronze bust of Colonel George Stanley, a former Royal Military College professor, who designed the Canadian Flag. For the Federal Building, Hamilton, Ontario, she completed eight large mezzo relief stone panels depicting wildlife and industry.

In 1996 she completed a sculpture of George Bernard Shaw for the then-new plaza in Niagara-on-the-Lake. Her last commissioned sculptures were of Conrad Black and his wife Barbara Amiel created in 2000 and 2002 respectively.

Death
Holbrook died of natural causes in Hamilton on February 23, 2009. She is buried at St. John's Anglican Church, Ancaster, Ontario alongside her husband "Jack" Holbrook and her son William "Billy" Holbrook. The family is interred next to a liturgical headstone designed by Holbrook.

Influenced
Holbrook mentored and influenced Canadian sculptor Christian Cardell Corbet.

Memberships
 Order of Canada
 Royal Canadian Academy of Arts
 Ontario Society of Artists
 Sculptors' Society of Canada
 Canadian Portrait Academy, 1997 - Founding Member
 Order of Ontario
 International Art Medal Association (FIDEM)
 Medallic Art Society of Canada
 Canadian Group of Art Medallists

Awards and honours
 1935 Awarded the Lieutenant Governor's Medal for Painting at the Ontario College of Art (second recipient)
 1969 Awarded the Gold Medal for Portraiture from National Sculpture Society of New York
 1977 Awarded the Queen Elizabeth II Silver Jubilee Medal
 1987 Awarded "Woman of the Year in the Arts" from the City of Hamilton, Ontario, Canada
 1994 Awarded Member Hamilton Hall of Distinction
 1982 Awarded the Ontario Society of Arts Award
 1992 Awarded the 125th Anniversary of the Confederation of Canada Medal
 1996 Appointment as Fellow, Ontario College of Art & Design
 1997 Appointment to the Order of Ontario
 1997 Appointment as Officer of the Order of Canada
 1997 Awarded Honorary Doctorate by McMaster University

References

External links
Official website
Representative
'Elizabeth Holbrook's panels: sleek, simplified and modern', Jul 27, 2011 Hamilton Spectator

1913 births
2009 deaths
Alumni of the Royal College of Art
Artists from Hamilton, Ontario
Cranbrook Academy of Art alumni
Members of the Order of Canada
Members of the Order of Ontario
20th-century Canadian sculptors
20th-century Canadian women artists